In probability and mathematical statistics, Ignatov's theorem is a basic result on the distribution of record values of a stochastic process.

Statement 

Let X1, X2, ... be an infinite sequence of independent and identically distributed random variables.  The initial rank of the nth term of this sequence is the value r such that  for exactly r values of i less than or equal to n.  Let  denote the stochastic process consisting of the terms Xi having initial rank k; that is, Yk,j is the jth term of the stochastic process that achieves initial rank k.  The sequence Yk is called the sequence of kth partial records.  Ignatov's theorem states that the sequences Y1, Y2, Y3, ... are independent and identically distributed.

Note 

The theorem is named after Tzvetan Ignatov a Bulgarian professor in probability and mathematical statistics at Sofia University. Due to it and his general contributions to mathematics, Prof. Ignatov was granted a Doctor Honoris Causa degree in 2013 from Sofia University. The recognition is given on extremely rare occasions and only to scholars with internationally landmark results.

References 

 Ilan Adler and Sheldon M. Ross, "Distribution of the Time of the First k-Record", Probability in the Engineering and Informational Sciences, Volume 11, Issue 3, July 1997, pp. 273–278
 Ron Engelen, Paul Tommassen and Wim Vervaat, "Ignatov's Theorem: A New and Short Proof", Journal of Applied Probability, Vol. 25, A Celebration of Applied Probability (1988), pp. 229–236
 Ignatov, Z., "Ein von der Variationsreihe erzeugter Poissonscher Punktprozess", Annuaire Univ. Sofia Fac. Math. Mech. 71, 1977, pp. 79–94
 Ignatov, Z., "Point processes generated by order statistics and their applications". In: P. Bartfai and J. Tomko, eds., Point Processes and Queueing Problems, Keszthely (Hungary). Coll. Mat. Soc. 5. Janos Bolyai 24, 1978, pp. 109–116
 Samuels, S., "All at once proof of Ignatov's theorem", Contemp. Math. 125, 1992, pp. 231–237
 Yi-Ching Yao, "On Independence of k-Record Processes: Ignatov's Theorem Revisited", The Annals of Applied Probability, Vol. 7, No. 3 (Aug., 1997), pp. 815–821
 Doctor Honoris Causa degree, 2013, in English
 Doctor Honoris Causa degree, 2013, in Bulgarian

Theorems regarding stochastic processes